is a Japanese naval officer who served as the Self Defense Fleet's Commander of the Japanese Maritime Self Defence Force (JMSDF) from 2019 to 2020. He is the 50th Commander of the Self-Defense Fleet, succeeding Manki Yamashita. In 2020, he was succeeded by Hideki Yuasa.

Career
Born in Aichi prefecture. In March 1985, he graduated from the 29th term of the National Defense Academy (mechanical engineering), joined the Maritime Self-Defense Force

In January 1996, he was promoted to 3rd class Kaisa.

In July 1999, he was again promoted to 2nd class Kaisa.

On 1 August 2001, he became the captain of the escort ship Chikuma.

On 6 August 2002, Equipment System Division, Defense Department, Maritime Staff Office.

On 1 January 2004, he was promoted to 1st class Kaisa.

On 1 August 2005, Maritime Staff Office Defense Department Defense Division Business Planning Group Leader and Maritime Self-Defense Force Executive School Work.

On 1 October 2007, he became the Commander of the 7th Escort Corps.

On 26 March 2008, he was the Commander of the 4th Escort Corps. On 1 December, assistant manager, Personnel Education Department, Maritime Staff Office.

On 26 July 2010, he was promoted to Rear Admiral. On 20 August, Commander of the 1st Escort Group.

On 26 July 2012, Chief of Staff, Ominato District General Manager.

On 22 August 2013, Chief of Staff, Fleet Escort Command.

On 5 August 2014, General Manager of Personnel Education Department, Maritime Staff Office.

On 22 December 2016, he was promoted to sea general and appointed commander of the 38th Escort Fleet.

On 1 April 2019, he was appointed Commander of the 50th Self-Defense Fleet. On 15 October, Commander of the Eastern Fleet of the Indian Navy, Maj. Gen. Suraj Berry, Commander of the Indian Navy, Captain Ashwin Arvind, Lieutenant Colonel Ginto George Chako, and Lieutenant Colonel of the Singapore Navy Lieutenant Colonel Chuah Meng Soon and Commander Cecil James Ladislaus of the British Navy paid a courtesy call on Hiroyuki Kasui, Commander of the Self-Defense Fleet. Kasui expressed his gratitude for visiting Japan to participate in the observing ceremony and stated that it was a pity that the observing ceremony was canceled due to the influence of Typhoon No. 19, and the commanders participating in each country thanked the Maritime Self-Defense Force for their support. Although the observing ceremony was cancelled, it was an opportunity to promote friendship with each country through this courtesy call.

On 25 August 2020, he was retired from the Navy. On December 1, he was ppointed as an advisor to Mitsubishi Heavy Industries.

On 2 July 2021, he was awarded by the US Government with the Legion of Merit.

Awards
 
 3rd Defensive Memorial Cordon

 7th Defensive Memorial Cordon

 10th Defensive Memorial Cordon

 11th Defensive Memorial Cordon

 15th Defensive Memorial Cordon

 18th Defensive Memorial Cordon

 19th Defensive Memorial Cordon

 20th Defensive Memorial Cordon

 21st Defensive Memorial Cordon

 22nd Defensive Memorial Cordon

 28th Defensive Memorial Cordon

 32nd Defensive Memorial Cordon

 33rd Defensive Memorial Cordon

 37th Defensive Memorial Cordon

 41st Defensive Memorial Cordon

 Legion of Merit

See also
Japanese military ranks

References

1963 births
People from Aichi Prefecture
Military personnel from Aichi Prefecture
Living people